Joyce Mary Bennett  (22 April 1923 – 11 July 2015) was the first Englishwoman to be ordained a priest in the Anglican Communion in 1971.

Biography 
Bennett was born in London. She was educated at Burlington school, Westminster, which was evacuated during the Second World War, to Milham Ford School in Oxford. She then took a degree in history and a diploma in education at Westfield College.

In 1949 she went to Hong Kong for the Church Mission Society to work at St. Stephen's Girls' College, and was eventually ordained a deacon in 1962.

Bishop Gilbert Baker petitioned the Archbishop of Canterbury, Michael Ramsey, for permission to ordain women. Hong Kong had already ordained a woman priest, Florence Li Tim-Oi, during the Japanese occupation in the Second World War. Along with Jane Hwang, Bennett was ordained a priest in December 1971.

She was the founding principal of St Catharine's School for Girls, Kwun Tong.

Bennett served as an Unofficial Member of the Legislative Council of Hong Kong from 1976 to 1983.

She was made an OBE in the 1979 New Year Honours, and in 1984 received an honorary doctorate from Hong Kong University. In 1994 she was made an Honorary Fellow of Queen Mary University of London.

Works

See also 
 Ordination of women in the Anglican Communion

References

1923 births
2015 deaths
Anglican clergy from London
20th-century English Anglican priests
Women Anglican clergy
Officers of the Order of the British Empire
Alumni of Westfield College
Members of the Legislative Council of Hong Kong
Hong Kong Anglicans
Hong Kong Christian clergy